Erki is a common Estonian-language male given name. Its name day in Estonia is 18 May. Related versions to Erki are Erkki, Eerikki (more common in Finland), Eerik, Erik, Erich, Eeri, Eero, Ergo, Ergi, and Erko (all share the 18 May name day). 

People with the name Erki include:
 Erki Kivinukk (born 1973), Estonian basketball player
 Erki Nool (born 1970), Estonian decathlete and politician
 Erki Pehk (born 1968), Estonian conductor
 Erki Pütsep (born 1976), Estonian professional road bicycle racer

References

Estonian masculine given names